The 2009 AFC U-16 Women's Championship qualification was qualification section of 2009 AFC U-16 Women's Championship. It was held from November 8 to 17 in Kuala Lumpur, Malaysia.

Group stage

Qualifying Group A 
All matches were held at MBPJ Stadium, Kuala Lumpur, Malaysia.

Qualifying Group B 
All matches were held at KLFA Stadium, Kuala Lumpur, Malaysia.

Ranking of third-placed teams 

Note: Myanmar's match against fifth-placed team Singapore was excluded.

Qualified Teams

Automatically qualified
  (2007 champions)
  (2007 runners-up)
  (2007 3rd place)

Qualified via competition
  (Group A winners)
  (Group A runners-up)
  (Group B winners)
  (Group B runners-up)
  (overall fifth)

AFC U-16 Women's Championship qualification
AFC
Women
2009
2008 in Malaysian football
2008 in youth association football